Gothangam railway station is a small railway station on the Western Railway network in the state of Gujarat, India. It serves Gothangam village. Passenger and MEMU trains halt here.

References

Railway stations in Surat district
Vadodara railway division